J Horn may refer to:

 Michael "J" Horn